Marc Jean-Bernard (born 14 May 1952) is a French philosopher, academic, writer, and classical guitarist. Among his main academic interests are Latin American culture, musicology, aesthetics, diplomatic dialogue, philosophy of music, and the hermeneutics of culture. He is currently based at the University of Puerto Rico in San Juan.

Early life and education
Jean-Bernard was born in Paris into a family of intellectuals and lawyers and began studying music formally as a child. He completed philosophy bachelor's and Master's degrees at Sorbonne, where he was influenced by philosophers Jacques Bouveresse and Vladimir Jankélévitch. In graduate school, he studied Georg Wilhelm Friedrich Hegel's Aesthetics, then wrote his doctoral thesis on the aesthetic and cultural resonance of Ludwig Wittgenstein's philosophical corpus in relation to Austrian/German culture and music.

Career
In 1978, while working on his doctorate at Sarbonne, Jean-Bernard started a career as a classical guitarist, conductor, and musicologist. He performed extensively as a soloist and conductor until 2000. He is strongly interested in Latin American music, literature, and Latin American culture and has examined Latin American music's narrative and mythical dimensions from a philisophical standpoint. He moved to Colombia and began teaching philosophy of language at the University of Valle in Cali; he also joined the Conservatorio Antonio María Valencia as the dean of music faculty. In 2004, he was nominated as a consul of France in Puerto Rico and left Colombia to became a professor of humanities at the University of Puerto Rico (UPR) in San Juan. As consul, he has been involved in the development of European studies in Puerto Rico in conjugation with European universities. He became the director of the international studies program at UPR in 2009. More recent interests include the dialogue between Europe and the United States, with a topical emphasis on Latin America from international relations and cultural perspectives. In 2010, he became the dean of Puerto Rico's consular corps and in 2014 founded the first Institute of International Relations of Puerto Rico, a nonprofit think tank.

In 2004, he was elected a member of the Academy of the Arts and Sciences of Puerto Rico and, in 2005, was made a commander of the Order of the Baron of Humbolt. As a musician, he has collaborated and played guitar on a number of albums, including Joaquín Rodrigo's L’Oeuvre pour Guitare and Fantasia para un Gentilhombre, Leo Brouwer's Works for Solo Guitar, Mario Castelnuovo-Tedesco's Complete Works for Solo Guitar, Vol. 1 and Heitor Villa-Lobos' Mélodies pour soprano et Guitare and Bachianas Brasileiras (5th edition)

Philosophical work

Jean-Bernard's philosophical studies are influenced by Merleau-Ponty, Wittgenstein, Bloch, Adorno, Jankélévitch, Schopenhauer, and Nietzsche. He believes the original unity between philosophy and music, which is rooted in western culture, has to be rethought and overcome with the acknowledgement of the internal relation between the theory of lógos and of αρμονια. This perspective stresses cultural hermeneutics, aesthetics, and musicology for the problem of universal unity and diversity in cultures. This open hermeneutics is focused in both practical and theoretical dimensions.

The Greek locution Dialegein synthesizes a theoretic set of axiological investigations, corresponding to a unified epistemic methodology that embraces cultural hermeneutics, specifically aesthetics and ethics. His construction of ethical and aesthetical responsibility stands as a philosophical cantus firmus for the understanding of cultural polyphony.  Jean-Bernard seeks to provide a philosophical account of cognitive sciences in the field of culture. The extension of research in philosophy of mind and continental philosophy assigns a theoretical imperative to ethical and cultural investigations, in order to grammatically fix the ambiguity of explanation. In contrast to the anti-functionalism and anti- physicalism of phenomenology and hermeneutics, his research on intentionality and subjectivity induces a deep revision of the dichotomy between the transcendental and analytical accounts of phenomenology. He starts with a clear grammar of the term intentionality, unifying its phenomenological and cognitive meaning. Then, a non-reductive perspective on mind and psychism examines cognitive intentionality (representational consciousness of cognition) and affective intentionality (non-representational consciousness and non-affective connaturality), following both the phenomenological description of consciousness and the legacy of Wittgenstein’s investigations on perception, knowledge, and psychology.

In his musical or philosophical essays and papers, Jean-Bernard stressed the relevance of values in the aesthetic experience considered as a counterpoint of hermeneutic gestures. This insight on symbolic consciousness and truth-content of art is exemplified throughout two ontologically interconnected main fields: music and architecture. Considering the non-representational and representational semantics of these fields, the temporalization and spatialization gestures implied in design and composition embrace the entire sphere of dwelling in a given world, what we call an aesthetical oikonomia. This connection between temporality and spatiality is exposed through recent examples, where axiological and "immunological" claims of a harmonic world are creatively expressed. These paradigmatic topics, focused on architectural design and musical compositions, are chosen between contemporary works from European, Japanese, North, and South American cultures.

Correspondingly, he crystallizes the claim for dialogue between cognitive and hermeneutics in art, ethics, and education. His dialogical perspective entails new methodological demands applied to cultural diversity. Phenomenological, grammatical, and cognitive approaches of today’s aesthetic endeavour induce a corresponding insight into the role of effective intentionality in ethics. He assumes that we are led to a synoptic view of responsibility, within a nonreductive frame. Responsibility, linking Wittgenstein to Levinas, and phenomenological to cognitive descriptions, emphasizes the exigent core of a philosophical telos.

Selected works
Jean-Bernard has published in French, Spanish, and English.

 2008 Paroles et musique dans le monde hispanique.  Éditions Indigo & Côté Femmes, Paris. 
 2009: "Estéticas de Pau Casals: el arco entre música y ética" in El Arco prodigioso: Perspectivas de Pablo Casals y su legado en Puerto Rico, ed. Pedro Reina, pp. 71-94. EMS Editores, San Juan. 
 2012: Tractatus musico-philosophicus, I.: Filosofía y estética musical. Editorial Postdata, San Juan. 
 2014: "Une triple articulation philosophique, culturelle et politique." Reveue de la Fondation Charles de Gaulle, (177).
 2014: "La aporía del nomos jurídico." Revista del Colegio de Abogados y Abogadas de Puerto Rico, 75(1-2): 291-331.
 2017: "André Malraux, Europa y los destinos de la cultura mundial." Revista Umbral, (2): 81-108.
 2018: Phénoménoologie du dialogue, I: Charles de Gaulle, une pensée diplomatique en acte - France-Amérique Latine. Éditions Édilivre, Paris. 
 2018: "The Grammars of Mystical Experience in Christian Theological Dialogue." Philisophy Study, 8(4). 
 2020: Phénoménoologie du dialogue, II: L'expérience mystique et le commandement du dialogue spirituel. Éditions Édilivre, Paris.

References 

 "Estilo de pensamiento y estilo musical by Jean-Bernard on the Paideia Archive (in Spanish)
 Aesthetics and Philosophy of the Arts on the Paideia Archive
 "Understanding and interpreting philosophical harmony: A music offering of the otherness" by Jean-Bernard on Midline (archive)
 Joaquín Rodrigo's best recordings on El Cultural (in Spanish)
 Primer Festival Musico-Literario (2009) from Universidad de Puerto Rico (archive; in Spanish)
 Jean-Bernard's CV from Universidad de Puerto Rico (archive; in Spanish)

External links
 Photo of Jean-Bernard at the Einstein Congress at the University of Puerto Rico (2005)

1952 births
 University of Paris alumni
French philosophers
 French musicians
 Living people
Hermeneutists
 French male non-fiction writers